Cryptolechia holopyrrha is a moth in the family Depressariidae. It was described by Edward Meyrick in 1912. It is found in Colombia.

The wingspan is 28–38 mm. The forewings are deep ferruginous-brown. The stigmata are obscure, cloudy and darker, the plical rather beyond the first discal. There is a very faint paler strongly curved subterminal line. The hindwings range from pale to rather dark reddish-fuscous.

References

Moths described in 1912
Cryptolechia (moth)
Taxa named by Edward Meyrick